Gouy is a commune in the Seine-Maritime department in the Normandy region in northern France.

Geography

Heraldry

Population

Places of interest
 The church of St.Pierre and Paul, dating from the twelfth century.
 Prehistoric finds in caves and graves by the Seine.

See also
 Communes of the Seine-Maritime department

References

External links

 Official website 

Communes of Seine-Maritime